Deer Creek is a town in Taylor County, Wisconsin, United States. The population was 733 at the 2000 census.

Geography
According to the United States Census Bureau, the town has a total area of 34.2 square miles (88.7 km2), of which, 34.2 square miles (88.6 km2) of it is land and 0.03% is water.

History
The six by six mile square that would become Deer Creek was first surveyed in 1851 by crews working for the U.S. government. In the fall of 1854 a different crew of surveyors marked all the section corners in the township, walking through the woods and swamps, measuring with chain and compass. When done, the deputy surveyor filed this general description:
This Township contains a large number of Swamps, all of which are unfit for cultivation. The lands is nearly all unfit for farming purposes, the soil being very poor and in most places the stone and gravel comes to the surface. The Timber is of poor quality, being mostly Hemlock & Birch. Where the land is rolling, the timber is Sugar Lind? and Elm.There is no Pine worth any thing in the Township. It is well watered by small streams, but none of them are of sufficient size for milling purposes.

Demographics
As of the census of 2000, there were 733 people, 241 households, and 201 families residing in the town. The population density was 21.4 people per square mile (8.3/km2). There were 253 housing units at an average density of 7.4 per square mile (2.9/km2). The racial makeup of the town was 98.50% White, and 1.50% from two or more races. Hispanic or Latino of any race were 2.59% of the population.

There were 241 households, out of which 44.4% had children under the age of 18 living with them, 73.9% were married couples living together, 4.1% had a female householder with no husband present, and 16.2% were non-families. 12.9% of all households were made up of individuals, and 5.0% had someone living alone who was 65 years of age or older. The average household size was 3.04 and the average family size was 3.34.

In the town, the population was spread out, with 31.7% under the age of 18, 6.5% from 18 to 24, 30.2% from 25 to 44, 22.5% from 45 to 64, and 9.1% who were 65 years of age or older. The median age was 34 years. For every 100 females, there were 108.2 males. For every 100 females age 18 and over, there were 110.5 males.

The median income for a household in the town was $49,688, and the median income for a family was $51,607. Males had a median income of $30,938 versus $21,500 for females. The per capita income for the town was $18,503. About 6.0% of families and 7.7% of the population were below the poverty line, including 9.2% of those under age 18 and none of those age 65 or over.

References

Towns in Taylor County, Wisconsin
Towns in Wisconsin